A skeptic is one who practices skepticism. 

Skeptic or Sceptic may also refer to:

Arts and entertainment
The Skeptics, a New Zealand post-punk band from 1979 to 1990
The Skeptic (album), by Tilian, 2018
"Skeptic" (song), by Slipknot, 2014
The Skeptic (film), a 2009 film

Magazines
The Skeptic (Australian magazine), of the Australian Skeptics
The Skeptic (British magazine), founded in 1987
Skeptic (American magazine), of The Skeptics Society, first published 1992

Organizations
Skeptic Society, a Russian-speaking skeptical society
The Skeptics Society, a US-based international organization devoted to promoting scientific skepticism

See also
 Skeptical Inquirer, US magazine, first published in 1976
 Denialism, a person's choice to deny reality, as a way to avoid a psychologically uncomfortable truth